Saronomus is a monotypic genus of ammotrechid camel spiders, first described by Karl Kraepelin in 1900. Its single species, Saronomus capensis is distributed in Colombia and Venezuela.

References 

Solifugae
Arachnid genera
Monotypic arachnid genera